Events from the year 2001 in France.

Incumbents
 President: Jacques Chirac
 Prime Minister: Lionel Jospin

Events
March – The Renault Vel Satis is launched at the Geneva Motor Show.
8 March – Cantonales Elections held.
11 March – Cantonales Elections held.
11 March – Municipal Elections held.
18 March – Municipal Elections held.
April – PSA Peugeot Citroën replaces two of its longest running cars – the Citroën Xantia and Peugeot 306 – with the Citroën C5 and Peugeot 307 respectively.
September – Citroën launches the all-new C3 hatchback at the Frankfurt Motor Show as a replacement for the outdated Saxo.
21 September – The AZote Fertilisant chemical factory in Toulouse, explodes, killing 29 and seriously wounding over 2500.
November – The Peugeot 307 is voted European Car of the Year.

Sport
15 April – Paris–Roubaix cycle race won by Servais Knaven of the Netherlands.
1 July – French Grand Prix won by Michael Schumacher of Germany.
7 July – Tour de France begins.
29 July – Tour de France ends, won by Lance Armstrong of the United States.

Births
 5 April – Thylane Blondeau, model and the daughter of soccer player Patrick Blondeau

Deaths

January to March
10 January – Jacques Marin, actor (born 1919).
21 January – Jean-Marie Goasmat, cyclist (born 1913).
30 January 
 Jean-Pierre Aumont, actor (born 1911).
 Michel Marcel Navratil, last French survivor and male survivor of the Titanic disaster (born 1908)
8 February – Raymond Polin, philosopher (born 1910).
18 February – Balthus, artist (born 1908).
19 February – Charles Trenet, singer and songwriter (born 1913).
4 March – Jean René Bazaine, painter, stained glass window designer and writer (born 1904).

April to June
10 April – Jean-Gabriel Albicocco, film director (born 1936).
19 April – André du Bouchet, poet (born 1924).
20 April – Maurice Lauré, creator of taxe sur la valeur ajoutée (TVA) (born 1917).
6 May – René Bondoux, fencer (born 1905)
14 May – Paul Bénichou, writer, critic and literary historian (born 1908).
15 May – Jean-Philippe Lauer, architect and Egyptologist (born 1902).
15 May – Sacha Vierny, cinematographer (born 1919).
17 May – Jacques-Louis Lions, mathematician (born 1928).
6 June – Marie Brémont, supercentenarian, the oldest recognized person in the world from November 2000 until her death (born 1886).
11 June – Pierre Eyt, cardinal (born 1934).
13 June – Louis de Maigret, Military officer (born 1914).
15 June – Henri Alekan, cinematographer (born 1909).
18 June – René Dumont, agronomist, sociologist and environmental politician (born 1904).
23 June – Corinne Calvet, actress (born 1925).

July to September
July – Hélène de Beauvoir, painter (born 1910).
3 August – Jeanne Loriod, musician (born 1928).
4 August – Michel de Salzmann, psychiatrist (born 1923).
12 August – Pierre Klossowski, writer, translator and artist (born 1905).
15 August – Raymond Abescat, oldest man in France and oldest veteran in France at the time of his death (born 1891).
25 August – Philippe Léotard, actor and singer (born 1940).
4 September – Simone de la Chaume, golfer (born 1908).

October to December
18 October – Micheline Ostermeyer, athlete and pianist (born 1922).
31 October – Régine Cavagnoud, alpine skier (born 1970).
11 November – Pierre Billaud, radio reporter and journalist, killed in Afghanistan (born 1970).
12 December – Jean Richard, actor (born 1921).
18 December – Gilbert Bécaud, singer, composer and actor (born 1927).
19 December – Marcel Mule, classical saxophonist (born 1901).

Full date unknown
Édouard Artigas, fencer (born 1915).
Marcel Bleibtreu, Trotskyist activist and theorist (born 1918).
Pierre Chevalier, caver and mountaineer (born 1905).
André Pascal, songwriter and composer (born 1932).

See also
 2001 in French television
 List of French films of 2001

References

2000s in France